RetroCode is a universal mobile content converter originally created by Retro Ringtones LLC. RetroCode is able to read and write most common sample based ringtone formats including meta-data.

Overview 

RetroCode reads and writes many common mobile sample content file formats. RetroCode takes measures for making sure that meta-data is maintained and converted between the formats. It features filters for adapting audio content to the abilities of small handheld devices. RetroCode also includes a ringback-signal synthesizer allowing to mix audio content with standard ITU ringback signals.

Compatibility 

RetroCode currently supports the following formats

Dependency 

RetroCode depends on a variety of open source libraries as well as some ISO reference implementations.
id3lib Version 3.8.3
faac
faad2
mp4ff part of faad2, patched for 3GPP compatibility
zlib
amrnb
amrwb
mp3lame
mad
avformat
avcodec
avutil
qscl
mpeg4ip

External links 
 Project home page

Audio format converters
Solaris software
Windows multimedia software
MacOS multimedia software
Multimedia software for Linux
Free software